The 2017–18 ABA League Second Division was the inaugural season of the ABA League Second Division with 12 men's teams from Serbia, Croatia, Slovenia, Montenegro, Bosnia and Herzegovina and Macedonia participating in it.

Teams

Team allocation 
On July 24, 2017, ABA League Assembly has decided to start the ABA League Second Division from the 2017–18 season, in which there will be 12 participants. Based on the results in the national championships and by taking into account which clubs have sent applications for participation in the ABA League Second Division, these teams will play in the ABA League Second Division.

League positions of the previous domestic league season after playoffs shown in parentheses.

Venues and locations

Personnel and sponsorship

Coaching changes

Qualifying rounds
Venue: Laktaši Sports Hall, Laktaši, Bosnia and Herzegovina

Pre-qualifying tournament

Qualifying tournament

Regular season

League table

Positions by round

Results

Final Four

Source: Adriatic League Second Division

Statistical leaders
 , after the end of the Regular Season.

| width=50% valign=top |

Points

 

|}

|}

| width=50% valign=top |

Assists

|}

|}Source: ABA League Second Division

MVP List

MVP of the Round

Attendances
Attendances include playoff games:

Second Division clubs in European competitions

See also 
 2017–18 ABA League First Division
 2017–18 WABA League
2017–18 domestic competitions
  2017–18 Basketball League of Serbia
  2017–18 A-1 League
  2017–18 Slovenian Basketball League
  2017–18 Prva A liga
  2017–18 Basketball Championship of Bosnia and Herzegovina
  2017–18 Macedonian First League

References

External links 
 Official website (Second Division)
 Official website (First Division)
 ABA League at Eurobasket.com

2017-18
Adriatic
2017–18 in Serbian basketball
2017–18 in Slovenian basketball
2017–18 in Croatian basketball
2017–18 in Bosnia and Herzegovina basketball
2017–18 in Montenegrin basketball
2017–18 in Republic of Macedonia basketball